Joe Matthews may refer to:

Joe Matthews (baseball) (1898–1968), American professional baseball player
Joe Matthews (politician) (1929–2010), South African activist and politician

See also
Joey Matthews (born 1979), American professional wrestler
Joseph Matthews (disambiguation)